NTFC may refer to:

Nantwich Town F.C.
Newcastle Town F.C.
Northampton Town F.C.